Guépratte is a general purpose  of the French Marine Nationale. She is the second French vessel named after the 19–20th century admiral Émile Paul Amable Guépratte. The ship was commissioned in 2001 and is currently in service. She is scheduled to remain in service until 2031.

Service history

She is the only frigate of the La Fayette class whose complement includes women, with 25 female crewmen on board. In January 2016, the first female commander of a frigate in the Marine Nationale was appointed to command Guépratte.

In 2016, Guépratte deployed as part of the Jeanne d'Arc battle group which included the amphibious assault ship .

In early 2022, Guépratte was deployed in the Indian Ocean but was expected to return to France in May after being relieved by her sister ship . Guépratte was again in the Arabian Sea in late 2022, operating with Combined Task Force (CTF) 150, when it seized large quantities of hashish and heroin from a fishing vessel. In early 2023, it was believed that Guépratte was involved in the boarding and seizure of an Iranian vessel reported to be carrying thousands of assault rifles and anti-tank missiles destined for Yemen.

Unlike other frigates of her class, it is not planned that she will incorporate a hull-mounted sonar system as part of her future sensor fit and therefore her potential anti-submarine capability is limited to that which might be provided by her shipborne helicopter. Guépratte is scheduled to undergo a modest structural and technical upgrade (with the elderly Crotale SAM to be removed from the vessel) and, given somewhat reduced general purpose capability, be re-assigned to offshore patrol duties prior to her planned withdrawal from service in 2031.

References

La Fayette-class frigates
Frigates of France
1999 ships
Ships built in France